This is the list of cathedrals in Azerbaijan sorted by denomination.

Armenian Apostolic
Ghazanchetsots Cathedral, Shusha, Nagorno-Karabakh

Former cathedral
Saint Thaddeus and Bartholomew Cathedral, Baku

Eastern Orthodox

Russian Orthodox Church
Cathedrals of the Russian Orthodox Church in Azerbaijan:
Holy Myrrhbearers Cathedral, Baku

Former cathedral
Alexander Nevsky Cathedral, Baku (destroyed 1936)

Catholic

Roman Catholic Church
Cathedrals of the Roman Catholic Church in Azerbaijan:

Church of the Immaculate Conception, Baku (Pro-Cathedral)

See also

Lists of cathedrals by country
Christianity in Azerbaijan

References

 
Azerbaijan
Cathedrals
Cathedrals